Grigory Laguta (born April 9, 1984) is a Russian-born Latvian motorcycle speedway rider. Laguta is current Individual Latvian Champion. He is a three-time Russian champion. In 2017 he was suspended for two years for a doping violation after having used meldonium.

Laguta have two speedway licences: Russian (MFR) and Latvian (LaMSF). His brother Artem (b. 1990) is also a speedway rider.

Speedway Grand Prix results

Honours 

 Individual World Championship (Speedway Grand Prix)
 2006 - 32nd place (0 points in 1 GP)
 2007 - 20th place (8 points in 1 GP)
 Team World Championship (Speedway World Cup)
 2008 - Semi-Final 1 will be on 12 July 2008
 European Club Champions' Cup
 2006  Tarnów - 4th place (5 points)
 2007 - 2nd place in Semi-Final 2 (13 points)
 2008  Slaný - The Final will be on 6 September 2008 (12 pts in Semi-Final)
 Individual Latvian Championship
 2008 Daugavpils - Latvian Champion

See also 
 Russia national speedway team
 List of Speedway Grand Prix riders

References

External links 
 (ru) Riders of Lokomotive Daugavpils

1984 births
Living people
Russian speedway riders
Latvian speedway riders
Russian sportspeople in doping cases
Latvian sportspeople in doping cases